Huh Sang-young (born 1 March 1967) is a South Korean field hockey coach of the South Korean women's national team.

He competed in the men's tournament at the 1988 Summer Olympics.

He coached the team at the 2018 Women's Hockey World Cup.

References

External links

Living people
South Korean field hockey coaches
1967 births
South Korean male field hockey players
Olympic field hockey players of South Korea
Field hockey players at the 1988 Summer Olympics
Place of birth missing (living people)
Asian Games medalists in field hockey
Asian Games gold medalists for South Korea
Field hockey players at the 1986 Asian Games
Medalists at the 1986 Asian Games